The Philippine Basketball Association opening ceremonies marks the start of the league's season. Since 1995, a single game is held, preceded by an entertainment program and parade of participating teams. The ceremonies is usually held at the third Sunday of October.

Overview

An opening ceremonies is held to mark the start of the season since the league's maiden season in 1975. The ceremonies typically start with an entertainment show, depending on the theme for that year. Usual highlights are performances of Filipino artists and speeches from the league commissioner and other invited guests. A parade of participating teams follows afterwards. Each team marches into the venue together with their muses. After all of the teams have paraded, the season's chairman of the PBA Board of Governors gives a speech and afterwards, he will officially declare the season open.

After the opening ceremonies, a lone game, the first game for the season, will be played. From 1975 to 1994, two games were played immediately following the ceremonies.

Venue
From 1975 to 1984, the league opened its season at the Araneta Coliseum in Quezon City, the league's primary venue for its games. After the league transferred its operations at the University of Life Theater and Recreational Arena (ULTRA) in Pasig, the opening ceremonies were exclusively held there from 1985 to 1992. After the fallout between the PBA and the Philippine Sports Commission, which operates the ULTRA, the league transferred its operations at the then newly built Cuneta Astrodome in Pasay in 1993. The league's opening ceremonies and the majority of its games were held at the Astrodome from 1993 to 1998. After the exclusive contract in the Cuneta Astrodome expired in 1999, the league returned to its previous home, The ULTRA, now renamed as the PhilSports Arena and held its opening ceremonies there for the first time in six years. When the league celebrated its 25th anniversary in 2000, the opening ceremonies were held at the Araneta Coliseum, where the league was inaugurated. The ceremonies were held at the venue exclusively until 2013.

For the 2013–14 season, the league's opening ceremonies was held at three different locations covering Luzon (Smart Araneta Coliseum, Quezon City), Visayas (Cebu Coliseum), and Mindanao (USEP Gymnasium, Davao City).

The league opened its 2014–15 season at the Philippine Arena in Bocaue, Bulacan; this was the first time that the league had its opening ceremonies outside Metro Manila and it was the first non-Iglesia ni Cristo and commercial event that was held in the arena.

The 2015–16 season opener was supposed to be held on October 18, 2015 at the Smart Araneta Coliseum but was suspended due to the onslaught of Typhoon Lando (international name: Kuppo). Instead, the opening was held on October 21 at the Mall of Asia Arena in Pasay. This was the first time for the following: suspension of opening ceremonies due to bad weather, an opening ceremonies that was held on a weekday, and the first opening ceremonies held in the Mall of Asia Arena.

Due to COVID-19 related restrictions, the 2021 opening ceremonies were held at the Ynares Sports Arena with no audience in the venue. The traditional parade of teams with muses was not done and a “simple” opening ceremonies were held instead. Players were present virtually.

Venues

References

External links 
PBA Official Website

Philippine Basketball Association lore
Annual sporting events in the Philippines